Almost All Questions Answered or aAQUA is a Farmer Knowledge Exchange available at aaqua.org answering questions from progressive farmers in 4 languages in any one of 420 districts in India and some places abroad.

Open To All
Any farmer, agriculturist or hobbyist can register and post questions and a panel of Agriculture Experts answers questions based on the problem description and photos if any.  Contextual Information such as geographical location, weather, season are retrieved automatically and made available to experts.  Apart from agriculture, aAQUA is a forum for questions regarding education, healthcare and other issues important to a developing population. Currently questions may be asked in one of four languages - Hindi, Marathi, Kannada and English.

Typical Q&A 
aAQUA uses discussion forum user interface to publish online the queries by one or more agri-users and responses and advice from other expert agri-users.  Here are links to several Q&A including cucumber harvest, foot and mouth disease outbreak among cattle, assisting an ailing goat, solution to a green chilli (pepper) infection, sowing information on onions, solution to cucumber disease and a clarification on cattle feed.  The most prolific farmer-users asking queries is found here.  An older version of frequently asked questions on the aAQUA forum can be found here.

Background
Originally developed at the Developmental Informatics Lab, aAQUA uses relational database management systems and information retrieval techniques with query optimization, intermittent synchronization and  multilingual support.   An excellent technical introduction is available in the Internet Computing Article. A chapter on aAQUA was published in a book by the Food and Agriculture Organization as a Case Study in the Asia Pacific Region.

Awards
 Manthan Award by Digital Empowerment Foundation (handed by Prof Anil Gupta of IIM Ahmedabad, Sivakumar of ITC e-Choupal and Sachin Pilot, MP.
 Indian Startups and Business Incubators Award (handed by Chief Minister of Maharashtra Prithviraj Chavan)

Technology Transfer
In 2014-15, the software was licensed perpetually to Tata Consultancy Services in a private agreement between Agrocom founders Anil Bahuman, Prof Ramamritham and TCS Chief Technology Officer Ananth Krishnan.  aAQUA Software was used to power the databases of TCS's mKrishi project including multi-lingual keyword search across Indian language documents using Natural Language Processing methods.

References

 Delay tolerant applications for low bandwidth and intermittently connected users: the aAQUA experience
 Robust Network for Rural Areas
 
 Delay tolerant applications for low bandwidth and intermittently connected users: the aAQUA experience
 The aAQUA Approach: Innovative Web 2.0 Tools for Developing Countries
 
 Information Need and Dissemination: Indian Rural Context
 IT infrastructure in emerging markets: arguing for an end-to-end perspective
 Digital Green: Participatory Video and Mediated Instruction for Agricultural Extension

External links
 aAQUA Webpage

Government-owned websites of India
Indian agricultural websites